The Mayor of Lucca is an elected politician who, along with the city council, is accountable for the strategic government of Lucca in Tuscany, Italy. The current mayor is Mario Pardini, a right-wing independent, who took office on 29 June 2022.

Overview
According to the Italian Constitution, the mayor of Lucca is member of the city council.

The mayor is elected by the population of Lucca, who also elect the members of the city council, controlling the mayor's policy guidelines and is able to enforce his resignation by a motion of no confidence. The mayor is entitled to appoint and dismiss the members of his government.

Since 1994, the mayor has been elected directly by Lucca's electorate. In all mayoral elections in Italy in cities with a population higher than 15,000 the voters express a direct choice for the mayor or an indirect choice voting for the party of the candidate's coalition. If no candidate receives at least 50% of votes, the top two candidates go to a second round two weeks later. The election of the city council is based on a direct choice for the candidate with a preference vote: the candidate with the majority of the preferences is elected. The number of the seats for each party is determined proportionally.

Kingdom of Italy (1861–1946)
In 1865, the Kingdom of Italy created the office of Mayor of Lucca (Sindaco di Lucca), appointed by the King himself. From 1892 to 1926, the mayor was elected by the city council. In 1926, the Fascist dictatorship abolished mayors and city councils, replacing them with an authoritarian Podestà chosen by the National Fascist Party. The office of mayor was restored in 1944 during the Allied occupation.

Timeline

Italian Republic (since 1946)

City Council election (1946–1994)
From 1946 to 1994, the mayor of Lucca was elected by the city's council.

Direct election (since 1994)
Since 1994, under provisions of new local administration law, the mayor of Lucca is chosen by direct election.

Timeline

References

Bibliography

External links
 

Lucca
 
Politics of Tuscany
Lucca